Manasu Rendum Pudhusu is a 1994 Indian Tamil-language film, directed by P. Amirtham. The film stars Jayaram and Khushbu. A remake of the 1990 Malayalam film Sasneham, it was released on 24 June 1994.

Plot 

Thomas and Lakshmi, both teachers, are a newly and happily married couple. They got married without their families' consent. Lakshmi finally gets pregnant, the news reaches their respective families. What transpires next forms the rest of the story.

Cast 

Jayaram as Thomas
Khushbu as Lakshmi
V. K. Ramasamy as Paramesh
R. Sundarrajan as Anthony
Poornam Viswanathan as Narayanan Iyer
Vinu Chakravarthy as Peter Raj
Vennira Aadai Moorthy as M. K. Varadaraja Bhagavathar
Mannangatti as Somu
Sukumari as Meenakshi
Vadivukkarasi
Shanmugasundari
Kavitha
S. N. Parvathy
Radhabhai
Anuja as Narayani
Smitha Sajith

Soundtrack 
The soundtrack was composed by Deva, with lyrics written by Vaali.

Reception 
Malini Mannath of The Indian Express gave the film a positive review, praising the performances of its lead pair. P. S. S. of Kalki wrote "the issue is not new, the story is also not new, the new is present only in the title. With such a flimsy plot, it is needlessly dragged and the end of the day we feel bored".

References

External links 
 

1990s Tamil-language films
1994 films
Films scored by Deva (composer)
Tamil remakes of Malayalam films